Tamunosiki Atorudibo (born 21 March 1985) is a Nigerian sprinter who specialized in the 100 meters.

Atorudibo held the World youth record over 100 meters until 2012, having bettered Darrel Brown's record over 10.24 by one-hundredth of a second on March 23, 2002. His record has since been tied by Rynell Parson in 2007.

External links
 

1985 births
Living people
Sportspeople from Rivers State
Nigerian male sprinters
People from Okrika
African Games medalists in athletics (track and field)
African Games silver medalists for Nigeria
Athletes (track and field) at the 2003 All-Africa Games